There are at least 158 named mountains in Beaverhead County, Montana.
 Ajax Peak, el. 
 Alder Peak, el. 
 Alturas Number One Mountain, el. 
 Alturas Number Two Mountain, el. 
 Antelope Peak, el. 
 Antone Peak, el. 
 Armstrong Mountain, el. 
 Arrowhead Mountain, el. 
 Bachelor Mountain, el. 
 Baldy Mountain, el. 
 Barb Mountain, el. 
 Barbour Hill, el. 
 Battle Mountain, el. 
 Beals Mountain, el. 
 Bender Point, el. 
 Benson Peak, el. 
 Big Point, el. 
 Black Lion Mountain, el. 
 Black Mountain, el. 
 Black Mountain, el. 
 Blacktail Mountains, el. 
 Bloody Dick Peak, el. 
 Bobcat Mountain, el. 
 Boner Knob, el. 
 Brays Butte, el. 
 Brownes Peak, el. 
 Browns Peak, el. 
 Burns Mountain, el. 
 Butch Hill, el. 
 Butch Hill, el. 
 Call Mountain, el. 
 Calvert Hill, el. 
 Camp Mountain, el. 
 Canyon Mountain, el. 
 Carroll Hill, el. 
 Center Mountain, el. 
 Cleve Mountain, el. 
 Comet Mountain, el. 
 Deer Mountain, el. 
 Deer Peak, el. 
 Diamond Butte, el. 
 Dixon Mountain, el. 
 Dry Hill, el. 
 Dutchman Mountain, el. 
 Eighteenmile Peak, el. 
 Elk Mountain, el. 
 Elk Mountain, el. 
 Ellis Peak, el. 
 Foolhen Mountain, el. 
 Gallagher Butte, el. 
 Gallagher Mountain, el. 
 Garfield Mountain, el. 
 Garrett Hill, el. 
 Goat Mountain, el. 
 Granite Mountain, el. 
 Graphite Mountain, el. 
 Grassy Top, el. 
 Gray Jockey Peak, el. 
 Greenstone Mountain, el. 
 Grizzly Hill, el. 
 Harrison Peak, el. 
 Highboy Mountain, el. 
 Hirschy Mountain, el. 
 Homer Youngs Peak, el. 
 Humbolt Mountain, el. 
 Inabnit Butte, el. 
 Indian Head, el. 
 Island Butte, el. 
 Italian Peak, el. 
 Jackson Hill, el. 
 Jeff Davis Peak, el. 
 Jim Brown Mountain, el. 
 Jumbo Mountain (Beaverhead County, Montana), el. 
 Keokirk Mountain, el. 
 Knob Mountain, el. 
 Laphan Mountain, el. 
 Lima Peaks, el. 
 Limestone Mountain, el. 
 Lion Mountain, el. 
 Little Table Mountain, el. 
 Lone Butte, el. 
 Lost Horse Mountain, el. 
 Maiden Peak, el. 
 Maurice Mountain, el. 
 Maverick Mountain, el. 
 Medicine Lodge Peak, el. 
 Merden Peak, el. 
 Middle Mountain, el. 
 Monument Hill, el. 
 Monument Peak, el. 
 Mooney Mountain, el. 
 Morgan Mountain, el. 
 Morrison Hill, el. 
 Mount Alverson, el. 
 Mount Jefferson, el. 
 Mount Tahepia, el. 
 Needle Rock, el. 
 Nemesis Mountain, el. 
 Odell Mountain, el. 
 Ore Camp Hill, el. 
 Painter Peak, el. 
 Patchtop Mountain, el. 
 Pinetop Hill, el. 
 Ponsonby Peak, el. 
 Pyramid Hill, el. 
 Pyramid Peak, el. 
 Quartz Hill, el. 
 Quartz Hill, el. 
 Reas Peak, el. 
 Red Butte, el. 
 Red Butte, el. 
 Red Butte, el. 
 Red Butte, el. 
 Red Conglomerate Peaks, el. 
 Red Rock Mountain, el. 
 Retort Mountain, el. 
 Round Top Mountain, el. 
 Saddle Mountain, el. 
 Saddleback Mountain, el. 
 Sawtooth Mountain, el. 
 Sawtooth Mountain, el. 
 Selway Mountain, el. 
 Seymore Mountain, el. 
 Sharp Mountain, el. 
 Shaw Mountain, el. 
 Sheep Mountain, el. 
 Sheep Mountain, el. 
 Sheep Mountain, el. 
 Shepherd Mountain, el. 
 Sheriff Mountain, el. 
 Ski Hill, el. 
 Slide Mountain, el. 
 Sourdough Peak, el. 
 Stewart Mountain, el. 
 Stine Mountain, el. 
 Storm Peak, el. 
 Sugarloaf Hill, el. 
 Sugarloaf Mountain, el. 
 Table Mountain, el. 
 Tash Peak, el. 
 Taylor Mountain, el. 
 Tent Mountain, el. 
 Tepee Mountain, el. 
 The Iron Mine, el. 
 Thunderhead Mountain, el. 
 Timber Butte, el. 
 Timber Butte, el. 
 Timber Hill, el. 
 Torrey Mountain, el. 
 Tower Mountain, el. 
 Trident Peak, el. 
 Tweedy Mountain, el. 
 Twin Adams Mountain, el. 
 Vinegar Hill, el. 
 West Pintler Peak, el. 
 White Hills, el. 
 Woody Mountain, el. 
 Wooster Mountain, el.

See also
 List of mountains in Montana
 List of mountain ranges in Montana

Notes

Beaverhead